Zeron D. Flemister (born September 8, 1976)  is a former American football tight end. As a senior at the University of Iowa, he played in and started seven games before playing in three postseason all-star games.  Flemister was then signed as a free agent by the Washington Redskins in 2000.

References 

1976 births
Living people
American football tight ends
Iowa Hawkeyes football players
Oakland Raiders players
New England Patriots players
Washington Redskins players
Sportspeople from Sioux City, Iowa
Players of American football from Iowa